This discography documents albums and singles released by American R&B/funk band Cameo.

Albums

Studio albums

Live albums
Nasty  (1996, Intersound)
Live: Word Up (1998, Universal)
Original Artist Hit List (2003, Intersound)
Nasty, Live & Funky (2007, Prestige)
Word Up! Greatest Hits – Live (2007, Silver Star)
Keep It Hot (2007, Sheridan Square)

Compilation albums

Singles

References

Discographies of American artists
Rhythm and blues discographies
Soul music discographies
Funk music discographies